Camplongo de Arbas is a locality and minor local entity located in the municipality of Villamanín, in León province, Castile and León, Spain. As of 2020, it has a population of 21.

Geography 
Camplongo de Arbas is located 54km north-northwest of León, Spain.

References

Populated places in the Province of León